Björn Jensen (born 12 January 1965 in Hameln, Germany) is a German filmmaker, consultant and producer.

Career
He is managing director of the Munich production company Ginger Foot Films. He studied German and Medieval Literature, English Literature and Drama at Ludwig Maximilian University of Munich as well as Business Administration (International Business) at University of Southern Queensland, Australia. He also is lecturer at various film academies and has been for a few years in the board of directors of AGDOK (German Documentaries) and the European Documentary Network.

Filmography (Producer)
Strings Attached (2009)
Where is who I was and am (2009)
Under the Ice (2007) (Co-Production with Kaspar Film)

Filmography (Supervising Producer)
Montreal Symphony - Kent Nagano and the Montreal Symphony Orchestra (2010) (together with Joachim Knaf and Jim Edwards)
Scientists under Attack (2009)
Hidden Children (2008) (together with Magnus Froböse)
Eileen Gray - Invitation to a Voyage (2006)
Deutschland versus Deutsch (2005)
To Tulsa and Back - On Tour With J.J. Cale (2005)
Days and Nights in Paris (2004)
Half of Life (2003)
Paradise on Earth (2003)
I'll be Rich and Happy (2002)
Martin Heidegger (2002)
Out of Edeka (2002)
Running Amok (2001)
Hollywood Profiles: Harvey Keitel (2001)
Self-Description (2001)
No Mercy (2000)
John Lee Hooker - That's My Story (1999)
Flight into the Jungle (1998)
The Haunted Screen (1998)
Hollywood Profiles:
Lauren Hutton, Isabella Rossellini, John Malkovich,
Kirk Douglas, Andy García, Woody Allen (1996–2001)
The Big Day (1996)
Love in Hollywood (1997)
Quiet Days in Hollywood (1994)
When the Sky Kisses the Mountains (1994)
The Germans (1994)
Directors of the New German Cinema:
Percy Adlon, Rainer Werner Fassbinder, Edgar Reitz,
Volker Schlöndorff, Margarethe von Trotta, Wim Wenders (1992–1995)
Crime of Passion (1992)

Filmography (Consultant)
Carajas (2009)
The Unknown (2008)

Filmography (Other)
Mozart in China (2008)
Marmorera (2007)
Child of Time (1992)
Trip to Tunis (1992)
Night on Fire (1992)
The Egg is a Shitty Gift of God (1992)
The Guilds (1991)
Faschings-mus (1985)
A Day Like A Year (1985)
Mexico City (1984)

External links
 www.gingerfoot.de
 AGDOK
 

German documentary film directors
1965 births
Living people
Film people from Lower Saxony
People from Hamelin
Ludwig Maximilian University of Munich alumni
University of Southern Queensland alumni